Henry Winstanley (31 March 1644 – 27 November 1703) was an English painter, engineer and merchant, who constructed the first Eddystone lighthouse after losing two of his ships on the Eddystone rocks. He died while working on the project during the Great Storm of 1703.

Early life and career
He was born in Saffron Walden, Essex, and baptised there on 31 March 1644.  His father Henry became land steward to the Earl of Suffolk, owner of Audley End House, in 1652, and young Henry also worked at Audley End, first as a porter and then as a secretary. In 1666 Audley End House was bought by Charles II for use as a base when attending Newmarket races, and it became effectively a royal palace.

Winstanley developed an interest in engraving after a grand tour of Europe between 1669 and 1674, where he was impressed by Continental architecture and the engravings in which it was portrayed.  On his return he is believed to have studied engraving with Wenceslas Hollar, and was employed at Audley End House as assistant to the Clerk of Works.  In 1676 he embarked on a detailed set of architectural engravings of Audley End House which took him ten years to complete and which survive as an important early record of English manor house architecture. He also designed a set of playing cards which became very popular and sold well.  He was appointed Clerk of Works at Audley End in 1679 on the death of his predecessor, and held the post until 1701.

Winstanley was well known in Essex for his fascination with gadgets both mechanical and hydraulic.  He had a house built for him at Littlebury which he filled with whimsical mechanisms of his own design and construction, and the "Essex House of Wonders" became a local landmark popular with visitors.  In the 1690s he opened a Mathematical Water Theatre known as "Winstanley's Water-works" in London's Piccadilly.  This was a commercial visitor attraction which combined fireworks, perpetual fountains, automata and ingenious mechanisms of all kinds, including "The Wonderful Barrel"  of 1696 which served visitors with hot and cold drinks from the same piece of equipment.  It was a successful and profitable venture and continued to operate for some years after its creator's death.

Construction of the Eddystone lighthouse

Winstanley became a merchant, investing some of the money he had made from his work and commercial enterprises in five ships.  Two of them were wrecked on the Eddystone Rocks near Plymouth, and he demanded to know why nothing was done to protect vessels from this hazard.   Told that the reef was too treacherous to mark, he declared that he would build a lighthouse there himself, and the Admiralty agreed to support him with ships and men.

Construction started on 14 July 1696.  The octagonal tower was to be built from Cornish granite and wood, with ornamental features and a glass lantern-room in which candles would burn to provide the light, and was to be anchored to the rock by 12 huge iron stanchions.  One notable incident during its construction occurred in June 1697.  At this time Britain and France were at war, and a naval vessel had been assigned to protect the workers whenever they were on the reef.  On this particular day, the commissioner at Plymouth, George St Lo, ordered the ship to join the fleet and did not provide a replacement. Instead, a French privateer destroyed the work done so far on the foundations and carried Winstanley off to France. Louis XIV, however, ordered his immediate release, with the words: "France is at war with England, not with humanity".  Winstanley returned to the Eddystone reef, construction resumed, and the first Eddystone Lighthouse was completed in November 1698.

The lighthouse suffered some weather damage during the winter of 1698 - 1699, and the light was often obscured by spray breaking over the top of the tower.  Winstanley therefore had it rebuilt the following spring on a larger scale, with extra stonework and even more elaborate decoration. Both lighthouses fulfilled their function. During the five years of their operation, no ships were wrecked on the Eddystone.

Death
Winstanley was recorded as having expressed great faith in his construction, going so far as to wish that he might be inside it during "the greatest storm there ever was". The tower was entirely destroyed on the night of 27 November 1703, during the Great Storm of that year.  Winstanley was visiting the lighthouse that night to make repairs, and he  lost his life.

See also
Eddystone lighthouse

References
 Barnes, Alison. Henry Winstanley: Artist, Inventor and Lighthouse-Builder, 1644-1703. Saffron Walden: Saffron Walden Museum, 2003.
 Hart-Davis, Adam & Troscianko, Emily. Henry Winstanley and the Eddystone Lighthouse. London, Sutton Publishing, 2002.
 Lewer, H.W. "Henry Winstanley, Engraver." Essex Review, Vol. 27 (Oct 1918) 161-171
 Semmens, Jason. "Eddystone - 300 Years." Fowey: Alexander Associates, 1998.

External links

Information on the Eddystone Lighthouse at Trinity House
http://www.cichw1.net/pmlight1.html Images of the first Eddystone lighthouse

1644 births
1703 deaths
English male painters
Inventors killed by their own invention
Lighthouse builders
People from Saffron Walden
17th-century English engineers
17th-century English painters
18th-century English painters
18th-century English male artists